Jordan School District is a school district in the southwestern portion of Salt Lake County, Utah, United States. It now employs 3,364 teachers and other licensed personnel who educate more than 57,800 students. An additional 3,092 employees provide support services for the system. Jordan District was the largest in Utah until the Canyons School District in the southeastern portion of the county split in 2009. Boundaries for Jordan District now include the communities of Bluffdale, Copperton, Herriman, Riverton, South Jordan and most of West Jordan.

Schools
One of the fastest-growing districts in the state, Jordan School District consists of 67 schools: 41 elementary, 13 middle, and 8 high schools, 2 technical schools, and 3 special schools.

High schools
Bingham (South Jordan)
Copper Hills (West Jordan)
Herriman (Herriman, Utah)
Kings Peak (Bluffdale)
Mountain Ridge (Herriman, Utah)
Riverton (Riverton) 
West Jordan (West Jordan)
Valley (South Jordan)

Middle schools
Copper Mountain (Herriman)
Elk Ridge (South Jordan)
Fort Herriman (Herriman)
Hidden Valley (Bluffdale) 
Joel P. Jensen (West Jordan)
Mountain Creek (South Jordan)
Oquirrh Hills (Riverton)
South Hills (Riverton)
South Jordan (South Jordan)
Sunset Ridge (West Jordan)
West Hills (West Jordan)
West Jordan (West Jordan)

Elementary schools
Antelope Canyon (West Jordan)
Aspen (South Jordan)
Bastian (Herriman)
Blackridge (Herriman)
Bluffdale (Bluffdale)
Butterfield Canyon (Herriman)
Columbia (West Jordan)
Copper Canyon (West Jordan)
Daybreak (South Jordan)
Eastlake (South Jordan)
Elk Meadows (South Jordan)
Falcon Ridge (West Jordan)
Foothills (Riverton)
Fox Hollow (West Jordan)
Golden Fields (South Jordan)
Hayden Peak (West Jordan), K-6, 1,200 students, established 1999.
Heartland (West Jordan)
Herriman (Herriman)
Jordan Hills (West Jordan)
Jordan Ridge (South Jordan)
Majestic Arts Academy (West Jordan)
Midas Creek (Riverton)
Monte Vista (South Jordan)
Mountain Point (Bluffdale)
Mountain Shadows (West Jordan)
Oakcrest (West Jordan)
Oquirrh (West Jordan)
Ridge View (Herriman)
Riverside (West Jordan)
Riverton (Riverton)
Rocky Peak (Bluffdale)
Rosamond (Riverton)
Rose Creek (Riverton)
Silver Crest (Herriman)
South Jordan (South Jordan)
Southland (Riverton)
Terra Linda (West Jordan)
Welby (South Jordan)
West Jordan (West Jordan)
Westland (West Jordan)
Westvale (West Jordan)

Technical Schools
Jordan Academy for Technology and Careers - North Campus (West Jordan)
Jordan Academy for Technology and Careers - South Campus (Riverton)

Special Schools
Kauri Sue Hamilton (Riverton, Utah)
River's Edge (South Jordan, Utah)
South Valley (West Jordan)

Educational Programs
Southpointe Adult High (West Jordan, Utah)

History
The district was created in 1904 with 3,354 students. Its name and original boundaries were taken from the Jordan Stake of the LDS Church, which at the time spanned the breadth of the Salt Lake Valley from east to west, and the length of the valley from roughly Midvale to the south end of the valley.

To the north was the Granite School District, named after the Granite Stake of the LDS Church, which was divided predominantly from the Jordan district along 6400 South from the Wasatch Mountain Range to the Oquirrh Mountains. A number of older students in Bennion (now Taylorsville)  elected to attend high school at Jordan High during the period of 1920-60 or later.

Split
When Jordan's east-side communities voted to break from the district and form their own, Jordan lost 44 of its 84 schools and a large part of its property tax base. This split caused a loss in property tax revenue; together with $16 million in state budget cuts, this created budget problems for the district.  As of August 13, 2009, the district faced a $33 million shortfall.  Jordan teachers lost nine days' pay, and were paid an average of 4.5 percent less in the 2009-2010 school year than they were paid in 2008-2009, and taxpayers faced a large property tax increase.

Continuing budget fallout

In early 2010, the Jordan district school board announced a $20 million shortfall caused by the loss of taxable property, and announced cuts that could slash teacher ranks, increase class sizes and impact extracurricular activities. On February 22, 2010, the board of education of the district had a meeting that turned into a protest, with hundreds of students saying "save our teachers!" Hundreds of students from several Jordan district schools walked out of their classes on February 24, 2010, to demonstrate at district headquarters over the announced budget cuts.

In 2015, the Washington Post reported that of the nation's largest school districts, the Jordan School District spent the least per student, $5,708. Utah is the state with the lowest spending per student, $6,555.

See also
List of the largest school districts in the United States by enrollment

References

External links
Official site

School districts in Utah
Education in Salt Lake County, Utah